Mukkamala Krishna Murthy  (1920–1982), known mononymously by his surname as Mukkamala (Telugu: ముక్కామల), was a lawyer turned actor who was active in Telugu films in the 1950s and the 1960s. He was a stage actor in his student days and was popular in the role of French General Bussy in Bobbili Yuddham, a stage play based on the historical Battle of Bobbili (Bobbili Yuddham). He joined the Telugu film industry in the late 1940s in Madras and played a variety of character roles in a career lasting for about 35 years. He died in 1982 (in Bobbili Puli movie titles, we can see "Swargeeya Mukkamala").

Filmography

Actor

1940s
 Maya Machindra (1945)
 Laila Majnu (1949)

1950s
 Swapna Sundari (1951)
 Nirdoshi (1951)
 Niraparadhi (1951)
 Mayalamari (1951)
 Prema (1952) as Parasuram
 Maradalu Pelli (1952)
 Dharma Devata (1952) as Raghunatha Varma
 Rechukka (1954) as Maharaju
 Aggiramudu (1954)
 Rani Ratnaprabha (1955)
 Tenali Ramakrishna (1956) as Tatacharyulu
 Sri Gauri Mahatyam (1956)
 Sarangadhara (1957)
 Maya Bazar (1957) as Duryodhana
 Appu Chesi Pappu Kudu (1958) as Rao Bahadur Ramadasu's Father
 Sobha (1958) as Lala
 Anna Thammudu (1958) as Nageswara Rao
 Jayabheri (1959) as Dharmadhikari
 Daiva Balam (1959)

1960s
 Annapurna (1960) as Narahari
 Jagadeka Veeruni Katha (1961) as Maharaju
 Usha Parinayam (1961) as Rajaguru
 Mahamantri Timmarasu (1962) as Prataparudra Gajapati 
 Gulebakavali Katha (1962) as King Chandrasena
 Narthanasala (1963) as Viraata Raju
 Sri Krishnarjuna Yudham (1963) as Duryodhanudu
 Guruvunu Minchina Sishyudu (1963) as Guruvu
 Babruvahana (1964) 
 Aggi Pidugu (1964)
 Bobbili Yudham (1964) as General Bussy
 Pandava Vanavasam (1965) as Durvasa
 Jwala Dweepa Rahasyam (1965) as Siddhendra Bhattaraka
 Satya Harishchandra (1965) as Viswamitra Maharshi
 Sri Krishna Pandaveeyam (1966) as Jarasandha
 Bhimanjaneya Yuddham (1966)
 Paramanandayya Sishyula Katha (1966) 
 Palnati Yuddham (1966) as Kommaraju
 Aggi Barata (1966) as Konda Buchodu
 Adugu Jaadalu (1966) as Singanna
 Bhama Vijayam (1967) 
 Bhuvana Sundari Katha (1967) as Chitrasenudu
 Ummadi Kutumbam (1967) as Subbaiah
 Goodachari 116 (1967) 
 Sri Sri Sri Maryada Ramanna (1967) 
 Bandipotu Dongalu (1968)
 Bhagya Chakramu (1968)
 Baghdad Gaja Donga (1968)
 Asadhyudu (1968)
 Ekaveera (1969)
 Nam Naadu (1969)

1970s
 Vijayam Manade (1970) 
 Mayani Mamata (1970) as Kotaiah
 Bomma Borusa (1971)
 Rangeli Raja (1971)
 Debbaku tha Dongala Mutha (1971) as Jaggu
 Apna Desh (1972) as Mrs. Dinanath Chandra
 Manavudu Danavudu (1972)
 Doctor Babu (1973) as Dharmanna
 Andala Ramudu (1973)
 Andaru Dongale (1974) as Jailer
 Manchi Manushulu (1974)
 Sri Ramanjaneya Yuddham (1975)
 Muthyala Muggu (1975) as Villain
 Bhakta Kannappa (1976) as Pedavema Reddy
 Ramarajyamlo Rakthapasam (1976)
 Pichi Maraju (1976) as Police Chief
 Seeta Kalyanam (1976) as  Viswamitra Maharshi
 Sita Swayamvar (1976) as  Viswamitra Maharshi
 Bangaru Manishi (1976) as Collector
 Kurukshetram (1977) as Dhritarashtra
 Daana Veera Soora Karna (1977) as Shalya
 Chanakya Chandragupta (1977) 
Jaganmohini (1978)
 Lawyer Viswanath (1978) as Raghavaiah
 Gandharva Kanya (1979)
 Sri Madvirata Parvam (1979) as Virata
 Sri Tirupati Venkateswara Kalyanam (1979)

1980s
 Vamsa Vruksham (1980)
 Bhale Krishnudu (1980)
 Kondaveeti Simham (1981)
 Kaliyuga Ramudu (1982)
 Justice Chowdary (1982)
 Bobbili Puli (1982)
 Golconda Abbulu (1982)
 Srimadvirat Veerabrahmendra Swami Charitra (1984)
 Pyaar Ka Sindoor (1986)

Director
 Maradalu Pelli (1952)
 Rushyasrunga (1961)
 Rishyasringar (1961)

Awards
Facilitations performed by Kalarajyam, Hyderabad and Mukkammala was crowned as "Natabrahma" which means a creator of acting.

Personal life
He was survived by four children: a son and three daughters. His eldest son is Subba Rao, eldest daughter Sita Rajya Lakshmi (an additional district judge at Nellore), second daughter Padmavathi (residing at Guntur), youngest daughter Seshamma (practising High Court advocate in Chennai).

References

External links
 
 Hindu: Niraparadhi 1951

Telugu male actors
1920 births
Indian male film actors
1982 deaths
People from Guntur
20th-century Indian male actors
Male actors in Telugu cinema